The New Favourites of... Brinsley Schwarz is the final studio album by Brinsley Schwarz, released in 1974, produced by Dave Edmunds.

Track listing
"(What's So Funny 'Bout) Peace, Love, and Understanding" (Lowe) – 3:34
"Ever Since You're Gone" (Lowe) – 4:08
"The Ugly Things" (Lowe) – 2:48
"I Got the Real Thing" (Gomm, Lowe) – 3:48
"The Look That's in Your Eye Tonight" (Lowe) – 4:14
"Now's the Time" (Allan Clarke, Graham Nash) - 2:06
"Small Town, Big City" (Lowe) – 4:31
"Tryin' to Live My Life Without You" (Eugene Williams) – 3:24
"I Like You, I Don't Love You" (Gomm, Lowe) – 3:27
"Down in the Dive" (Lowe, Schwarz) – 4:54

Personnel
Brinsley Schwarz
 Brinsley Schwarz – guitar, alto and tenor saxophone, vocals
 Ian Gomm – guitars, vocals
 Billy Rankin – drums
 Bob Andrews	– keyboards, alto saxophone, vocals
 Nick Lowe	– bass guitar, acoustic guitar, vocals
 Carlos Luna – harmonica
Technical
Pierre Tubbs – cover concept
Paul May – design
Bryce Attwell, Keith Morris – photography

References

Brinsley Schwarz albums
1974 albums
Albums produced by Dave Edmunds
United Artists Records albums
Albums recorded at Rockfield Studios